Mount Titus is a mountain, 2,840 m, surmounting the heights between the Staircase and Kelly Glaciers in the Admiralty Mountains, Victoria Land, in eastern Antarctica.

It was mapped by the United States Geological Survey from surveys and U.S. Navy air photos, 1960–1962. The mountain was named by Advisory Committee on Antarctic Names for Robert W. Titus, meteorologist, station scientific leader at Hallett Station, 1961.

Mountains of Victoria Land
Borchgrevink Coast